Cheilosia barbata  is a Palearctic hoverfly.

Description
Resembles several other Cheilosia. Determination is problematic. Key references include Van der Goot, V.S. (1981)  The male terminalia are illustrated Stubbs and Falk (1983).

Distribution and biology
It is found from Fennoscandia south to central Spain and Britain east through most of Central Europe to parts of European Russia and through high altitude areas of southern Europe to Yugoslavia in deciduous woodland. Adults visit flowers of Caltha, Chaerophyllum, Crataegus, Euphorbia, Ranunculus, Sambucus, Taraxacum from May to August.

References

External links
 Images representing Cheilosia barbata

Diptera of Europe
Eristalinae
Insects described in 1857